 
Polányi, Polanyi is a surname. There have been a number of prominent individuals in the Polanyi family, illustrated in the following family tree:

Adolf Pollacsek (1820–1871) ∞ Zsófia Schlesinger
Mihály Pollacsek (March 21, 1848, Bánhegy (Dluha) – January 10, 1905), prominent member of the bourgeoisie involved in railroads ∞ (1881 in Warsaw) Cecília Wohl (1862, Vilnius – 1939, Budapest), daughter of Lithuanian Rabbi Alex Wohl, held a literary salon in Budapest
Laura Polanyi, later Striker (1882–1957), ∞ Sándor Striker
Eva Striker Zeisel, American industrial designer
Adolf Polányi
Karl Paul Polanyi (1886, Vienna – 1964, Pickering, Ontario), a Hungarian-Canadian political economist and author of The Great Transformation ∞ Ilona Duczyńska
Kari Polanyi Levitt (born 1923, Vienna), the Emerita Professor of Economics at McGill University
Sophia (Zsófia) Polányi
Michael Polanyi (1891, Budapest – 1976, Manchester), Hungarian chemist, philosopher of science, economist∞ Magda Elizabeth Polanyi
John Charles Polanyi (born 1929, Berlin), Canadian Nobel Prize winner in Chemistry
Paul (Pál) Polányi
Lujza Pollacsek
Ervin Szabó (1877–1918)
Vilma Pollacsek
Irma Seidler, early love of György Lukács
Ernő Seidler, founding member of the Communist Party of Hungary

Other 
The name is also referenced in:
 Michael Polanyi Center (MPC), Baylor University
 The Eyring-Polanyi equation
 Bell–Evans–Polanyi principle

See also 
 Polany (disambiguation)
 Poľany
 Polány
 Magyarpolány

References 

Hungarian noble families
Jewish families
Hungarian Jews
Slovak Jews
Hungarian people of Slovak descent
Austro-Hungarian Jews
Jewish Hungarian history
Hungarian-language surnames
Hungarian people of Polish-Jewish descent